Paul Konrad Emil Usteri (12 August 1853 – 1 February 1927) was a Swiss politician and President of the Swiss Council of States (1909/1910).

External links 
 
 

1853 births
1927 deaths
Members of the Council of States (Switzerland)
Presidents of the Council of States (Switzerland)